Pietro Toselli (22 December 1856 - 7 December 1895) was a major of the Royal Italian Army. He is mainly known for his participation in the First Italo-Ethiopian War. He was born in Peveragno in 1856, the youngest of three siblings. His father was Giovanni Maria Toselli, and his mother Teresa (Botasso) Toselli. His older brother Enrico Toselli was a noted psychiatrist and university professor. Pietro Toselli joined the army at a young age and was commissioned Second lieutenant of Artillery in 1878. After finishing the tree year curriculum for artillerymen he opted for additional training in military engineering. After finishing his education in 1880 he became a First lieutenant.  In 1887 he was promoted to Captain. He first came to Africa in 1888 to carry out topographical work in the new colony of Italian Eritrea. Returning to Italy he published the book Pro Africa italica under the pseudonym "Un Eritreo".  In 1894 he returned to Italian Eritrea to take command of the 4th Askari Battalion of the Corpo Speciale per L'Africa. He led Italian forces to victory at the Battle of Halai on the 18 December 1894, when his troops defeated the Eritrean forces of Batha Agos, who were besieging the Italian fort at Halai. On the 13 January 1895, he commanded the 4th Askari Battalion at the Battle of Coatit under the command of Oreste Baratieri. After the Ethiopian retreat Toselli, and the 4th Askari Battalion formed the Italian vanguard that caught up with the Ethiopian forces at the Battle of Senafe.

When the Royal Italian Army invaded Tigray, Toselli was sent with 1,450 soldiers, 700 militiamen, and four cannons to occupy and fortify the forward position at Amba Alagi. On the 7 December 1895 the Battle of Amba Alagi began when the position came under attack by the troops of Makonnen Wolde Mikael. Due to a miscommunication with Major general Giuseppe Arimondi. Toselli believed Arimondi was moving south to reenforce him and chose to stand his ground. After several hours of fighting and being almost surrounded he gave the order for a general retreat. He led the retreating column north to Bet Mariam. Toselli was by then exhausted and could not move on with his men, he died from a gunshot wound near Bet-Mariam when the advancing Ethiopians reached his position. His body was returned to Italy two years after his death and he is buried in his hometown of Peveragno.

References

1856 births
1895 deaths
Italian Army officers
People from the Province of Cuneo
People of former Italian colonies
Italian military personnel of the First Italo-Ethiopian War
Italian military personnel killed in the First Italo-Ethiopian War